The 2013–14 Biathlon World Cup was a multi-race tournament over a season of biathlon, organised by the International Biathlon Union. The season started on 24 November 2013 in Östersund, Sweden, and ended on 23 March 2014 in Holmenkollen, Norway.

Kaisa Mäkäräinen was the winner at the conclusion of the season with Tora Berger 2nd. However, the results of Olga Zaitseva were later annulled due do doping offences. The recalculation would have given overall world cup win to Berger, but the IBU made the decision based on the principle that clean athletes cannot be punished for the doping offenses of others. So, two first places were awarded in the women's overall.

Calendar
Below is the IBU World Cup calendar for the 2013–14 season.

 2014 Winter Olympics races are not included in the 2013–14 World Cup scoring system with the exception of mixed relay.
 In stage 6, women's relay was suspended due to poor visibility and dense fog.

World Cup podiums

Men

Women

Men's team

Women's team

Mixed relay

Standings (men)

Overall 

Final standings after 22 races.

Individual 

Final standings after 2 races.

Sprint 

Final standings after 9 races.

Pursuit 

Final standings after 8 races.

Mass start 

Final standings after 3 races.

Relay 

Final standings after 4 races.

Nation 

Final standings after 17 races.

Standings (women)

Overall 

Final standings after 22 races.

Individual 

Final standings after 2 races.

Sprint 

Final standings after 9 races.

Pursuit 

Final standings after 8 races.

Mass start 

Final standings after 3 races.

Relay 

Final standings after 3 races.

Nation 

Final standings after 17 races.

Standings: Mixed

Mixed relay 

Final standings after 2 races.

Medal table

Achievements
First World Cup career victory
, 29, in her 6th season — the WC 2 Sprint in Hochfilzen; it also was her first podium
, 20, in his 2nd season — the WC 3 Sprint in Annecy-Le Grand Bornand; it also was his first podium
, 27, in her 8th season — the WC 3 Pursuit in Annecy-Le Grand Bornand; first podium was 2010–11 Sprint in Presque Isle
, 26, in her 5th season — the WC 6 Sprint in Antholz-Anterselva; it also was her first podium
, 24, in his 5th season — the WC 6 Sprint in Antholz-Anterselva; first podium was 2010–11 Mass start in Khanty-Mansiysk
, 25, in his 6th season — the WC 6 Sprint in Antholz-Anterselva; first podium was 2009–10 Pursuit in Holmenkollen
, 23, in her 3rd season — the WC 7 Sprint in Pokljuka; it also was her first podium

First World Cup podium
, 26, in her 2nd season — no. 3 in the WC 2 Sprint in Hochfilzen
, 23, in her 3rd season — no. 2 in the WC 2 Pursuit in Hochfilzen
, 23, in her 3rd season — no. 3 in the WC 3 Pursuit in Annecy-Le Grand Bornand
, 25, in his 5th season — no. 2 in the WC 4 Mass start in Oberhof
, 25, in his 6th season — no. 2 in the WC 6 Pursuit in Antholz-Anterselva
, 25, in her 1st season — no. 2 in the WC 7 Sprint in Pokljuka
, 23, in her 4th season — no. 3 in the WC 7 Pursuit in Pokljuka
, 26, in her 7th season — no. 3 in the WC 8 Sprint in Kontiolahti
, 32, in his 10th season — no. 3 in the WC 8 Sprint (2) in Kontiolahti
, 28, in her 3rd season — no. 3 in the WC 9 Sprint in Holmenkollen

Victory in this World Cup (all-time number of victories in parentheses)

Men
 , 5 (29) first places
 , 5 (5) first places
 , 4 (35) first places
 , 2 (7) first places
 , 2 (2) first places
 , 1 (7) first place
 , 1 (5) first place
 , 1 (4) first place
 , 1 (2) first place
 , 1 (1) first place

Women
 , 4 (16) first places
 , 4 (9) first places
 , 3 (7) first places
 , 2 (6) first places
 , 2 (2) first places
 , 1 (28) first place
 , 1 (22) first place
 , 1 (2) first place
 , 1 (2) first place
 , 1 (1) first place
 , 1 (1) first place
 , 1 (1) first place

Retirements
Following notable biathletes announced their retirement during or after the 2013–14 season:

Men

Women

 (comeback in 2015–16 season for Belarus)
 (comeback in 2015–16 season)

External links
IBU official site

Footnotes

References

 
Biathlon World Cup
World Cup
World Cup